Kottucherry is a commune in Karaikal district, in the Indian state of Puducherry. The commune comprises a village of the same name, as well as the villages of Poovam, Thiruvettakudy and Varichikudy.

Demographics
According to 2011 census of India, the population of Kottucherry commune is 17442.The male population of the commune is 8688 and the female population is 8754.

References

Villages in Karaikal district